is a junction railway station in the city of  Ōsaki, Miyagi, Japan, operated by the East Japan Railway Company (JR East).

Lines

Station layout
The Rikuu East Line has a single ground-level island platform at a right angle to the station building and the Shinkansen platforms. The elevated Shinkansen station has two side platforms serving two tracks. The platforms are equipped with platform screen doors. The station has a "Midori no Madoguchi" staffed ticket office.

Platforms

History
The station opened on April 20, 1913. On June 11, 1915, it was renamed . On November 1, 1980, the station name was changed back to Furukawa Station, and the station was relocated to its present location. Tohoku Shinkansen services started on June 23, 1982. The station was absorbed into the JR East network upon the privatization of the Japanese National Railways (JNR) on April 1, 1987.

Passenger statistics
In fiscal 2018, the station was used by an average of 4,879 passengers daily (boarding passengers only).

Surrounding area 
central Ōsaki city
Furukawa Post Office

See also
 List of railway stations in Japan

References

External links
   

Railway stations in Japan opened in 1913
Railway stations in Miyagi Prefecture
Tōhoku Shinkansen
Rikuu East Line
Ōsaki, Miyagi